The canton of Hazebrouck is an administrative division of the Nord department, northern France. It was created at the French canton reorganisation which came into effect in March 2015. Its seat is in Hazebrouck.

It consists of the following communes:

Blaringhem
Boëseghem
Ebblinghem
Estaires
La Gorgue
Haverskerque
Hazebrouck
Lynde
Merville
Morbecque
Neuf-Berquin
Renescure
Sercus
Steenbecque
Thiennes
Wallon-Cappel

References

Cantons of Nord (French department)